The Process of Human Extermination is the debut studio album by American deathcore band Fit for an Autopsy. The album was released June 21, 2011 through BMA and was produced by the band's guitarist Will Putney.

Track listing

Personnel 
Credits adapted from album's liner notes.

Fit for an Autopsy
 Nate Johnson – lead vocals
 Pat Sheridan – guitars, backing vocals
 Will Putney – guitars, bass, production, engineering, mixing, mastering
 Brian Mathis – drums

Additional personnel
 Aaron Marsh – layout

References

External links 
 

2011 debut albums
Fit for an Autopsy albums